The geographic coordinate system (GCS) is a spherical or ellipsoidal coordinate system for measuring and communicating positions directly on the Earth as latitude and longitude. It is the simplest, oldest and most widely used of the various spatial reference systems that are in use, and forms the basis for most others. Although latitude and longitude form a coordinate tuple like a cartesian coordinate system, the geographic coordinate system is not cartesian because the measurements are angles and are not on a planar surface.

A full GCS specification, such as those listed in the EPSG and ISO 19111 standards, also includes a choice of geodetic datum (including an Earth ellipsoid), as different datums will yield different latitude and longitude values for the same location.

History 

The invention of a geographic coordinate system is generally credited to Eratosthenes of Cyrene, who composed his now-lost Geography at the Library of Alexandria in the 3rd century BC. A century later, Hipparchus of Nicaea improved on this system by determining latitude from stellar measurements rather than solar altitude and determining longitude by timings of lunar eclipses, rather than dead reckoning. In the 1st or 2nd century, Marinus of Tyre compiled an extensive gazetteer and mathematically plotted world map using coordinates measured east from a prime meridian at the westernmost known land, designated the Fortunate Isles, off the coast of western Africa around the Canary or Cape Verde Islands, and measured north or south of the island of Rhodes off Asia Minor. Ptolemy credited him with the full adoption of longitude and latitude, rather than measuring latitude in terms of the length of the midsummer day.

Ptolemy's 2nd-century Geography used the same prime meridian but measured latitude from the Equator instead. After their work was translated into Arabic in the 9th century, Al-Khwārizmī's Book of the Description of the Earth corrected Marinus' and Ptolemy's errors regarding the length of the Mediterranean Sea, causing medieval Arabic cartography to use a prime meridian around 10° east of Ptolemy's line. Mathematical cartography resumed in Europe following Maximus Planudes' recovery of Ptolemy's text a little before 1300; the text was translated into Latin at Florence by Jacobus Angelus around 1407.

In 1884, the United States hosted the International Meridian Conference, attended by representatives from twenty-five nations. Twenty-two of them agreed to adopt the longitude of the Royal Observatory in Greenwich, England as the zero-reference line. The Dominican Republic voted against the motion, while France and Brazil abstained. France adopted Greenwich Mean Time in place of local determinations by the Paris Observatory in 1911.

Latitude and longitude

The "latitude" (abbreviation: Lat., or phi) of a point on Earth's surface is the angle between the equatorial plane and the straight line that passes through that point and through (or close to) the center of the Earth. Lines joining points of the same latitude trace circles on the surface of Earth called parallels, as they are parallel to the Equator and to each other. The North Pole is 90° N; the South Pole is 90° S. The 0° parallel of latitude is designated the Equator, the fundamental plane of all geographic coordinate systems. The Equator divides the globe into Northern and Southern Hemispheres.

The "longitude" (abbreviation: Long., or lambda) of a point on Earth's surface is the angle east or west of a reference meridian to another meridian that passes through that point. All meridians are halves of great ellipses (often called great circles), which converge at the North and South Poles. The meridian of the British Royal Observatory in Greenwich, in southeast London, England, is the international prime meridian, although some organizations—such as the French Institut national de l'information géographique et forestière—continue to use other meridians for internal purposes. The prime meridian determines the proper Eastern and Western Hemispheres, although maps often divide these hemispheres further west in order to keep the Old World on a single side. The antipodal meridian of Greenwich is both 180°W and 180°E. This is not to be conflated with the International Date Line, which diverges from it in several places for political and convenience reasons, including between far eastern Russia and the far western Aleutian Islands.

The combination of these two components specifies the position of any location on the surface of Earth, without consideration of altitude or depth. The visual grid on a map formed by lines of latitude and longitude is known as a graticule.

Geodetic datum 

In order to be unambiguous about the direction of "vertical" and the "horizontal" surface above which they are measuring, map-makers choose a reference ellipsoid with a given origin and orientation that best fits their need for the area to be mapped. They then choose the most appropriate mapping of the spherical coordinate system onto that ellipsoid, called a terrestrial reference system or geodetic datum.

Datums may be global, meaning that they represent the whole Earth, or they may be local, meaning that they represent an ellipsoid best-fit to only a portion of the Earth. Points on the Earth's surface move relative to each other due to continental plate motion, subsidence, and diurnal Earth tidal movement caused by the Moon and the Sun. This daily movement can be as much as a meter. Scandinavia is rising by  a year as a result of the melting of the ice sheets of the last ice age, but neighboring Scotland is rising by only . These changes are insignificant if a local datum is used, but are statistically significant if a global datum is used.

Examples of global datums include World Geodetic System (WGS84, also known as EPSG:4326), the default datum used for the Global Positioning System, and the International Terrestrial Reference System and Frame (ITRF), used for estimating continental drift and crustal deformation. The distance to Earth's center can be used both for very deep positions and for positions in space.

Local datums chosen by a national cartographical organization include the North American Datum, the European ED50, and the British OSGB36. Given a location, the datum provides the latitude  and longitude . In the United Kingdom there are three common latitude, longitude, and height systems in use. WGS84 differs at Greenwich from the one used on published maps OSGB36 by approximately 112m. The military system ED50, used by NATO, differs from about 120m to 180m.

The latitude and longitude on a map made against a local datum may not be the same as one obtained from a GPS receiver. Converting coordinates from one datum to another requires a datum transformation such as a Helmert transformation, although in certain situations a simple translation may be sufficient.

In popular GIS software, data projected in latitude/longitude is often represented as a Geographic Coordinate System. For example, data in latitude/longitude if the datum is the North American Datum of 1983 is denoted by 'GCS North American 1983'.

Length of a degree

On the GRS80 or WGS84 spheroid at sea level at the Equator, one latitudinal second measures 30.715 meters, one latitudinal minute is 1843 meters and one latitudinal degree is 110.6 kilometers. The circles of longitude, meridians, meet at the geographical poles, with the west–east width of a second naturally decreasing as latitude increases. On the Equator at sea level, one longitudinal second measures 30.92 meters, a longitudinal minute is 1855 meters and a longitudinal degree is 111.3 kilometers. At 30° a longitudinal second is 26.76 meters, at Greenwich (51°28′38″N) 19.22 meters, and at 60° it is 15.42 meters.

On the WGS84 spheroid, the length in meters of a degree of latitude at latitude  (that is, the number of meters you would have to travel along a north–south line to move 1 degree in latitude, when at latitude ), is about

The returned measure of meters per degree latitude varies continuously with latitude.

Similarly, the length in meters of a degree of longitude can be calculated as

(Those coefficients can be improved, but as they stand the distance they give is correct within a centimeter.)

The formulae both return units of meters per degree.

An alternative method to estimate the length of a longitudinal degree at latitude  is to assume a spherical Earth (to get the width per minute and second, divide by 60 and 3600, respectively):

Since the Earth is an oblate spheroid, not spherical, that result can be off by several tenths of a percent; a better approximation of a longitudinal degree at latitude  is

( is known as the reduced (or parametric) latitude). Aside from rounding, this is the exact distance along a parallel of latitude; getting the distance along the shortest route will be more work, but those two distances are always within 0.6 meter of each other if the two points are one degree of longitude apart.

Alternate encodings
Like any series of multiple-digit numbers, latitude-longitude pairs can be challenging to communicate and remember. Therefore, alternative schemes have been developed for encoding GCS coordinates into alphanumeric strings or words:
 the Maidenhead Locator System, popular with radio operators.
 the World Geographic Reference System (GEOREF), developed for global military operations, replaced by the current Global Area Reference System (GARS).
 Open Location Code or "Plus Codes", developed by Google and released into the public domain.
 Geohash, a public domain system based on the Morton Z-order curve.
 Mapcode, an open-source system originally developed at TomTom.
 What3words, a proprietary system that encodes GCS coordinates as pseudorandom sets of words by dividing the coordinates into three numbers and looking up words in an indexed dictionary.

Note that these are not distinct coordinate systems, only alternative methods for expressing latitude and longitude measurements.

See also 
 
 
 
 
 ISO 6709, standard representation of geographic point location by coordinates
 
 
 Planetary coordinate system
 Selenographic coordinate system
 
 Jan Smits (2015). Mathematical data for bibliographic descriptions of cartographic materials and spatial data. Geographical co-ordinates. ICA Commission on  Map Projections.

Notes

References

Sources 

 Portions of this article are from Jason Harris' "Astroinfo" which is distributed with KStars, a desktop planetarium for Linux/KDE. See The KDE Education Project - KStars

External links 
 

 
Cartography

Geodesy
Navigation